Selo pri Zagorici is a small settlement in the Municipality of Mirna Peč in the Lower Carniola region in southeastern Slovenia. The municipality is part of the Southeast Slovenia Statistical Region.

References

External links
Selo pri Zagorici on Geopedia

Populated places in the Municipality of Mirna Peč